Oh No, Mam'zelle (French title: Mam'zelle Nitouche) is a French-Italian musical comedy film from 1954, directed by Yves Allégret, written by Marcel Achard, starring Fernandel and Louis de Funès.

Cast 
 Fernandel as Célestin, the organist and Floridor the compositor
 Pier Angeli as Denise de Flavigny and Mlle Nitouche
 Jean Debucourt as the commandant major Léon de Longueville
 Renée Devillers as mother, sister of the commander
 Michèle Cordoue as Corinne, the actress, teacher of Floridor and protected from the commander
 François Guérin as the first lieutenant André La Vauzelle
 Nerio Bernardi as the Italian grocer who accepts pots of flowers
 Hélène Tossy as wife of the commander major
 Georges Chamarat as the warrant officer
 Margo Lion as Léontine, the sister tourière
 Louis de Funès as the field marshal of homes Petrot
 Pierre Olaf, as a reserve officer

References

External links 
 
 Mam'zelle Nitouche (1954) at the Films de France

1954 films
French comedy films
1950s French-language films
French black-and-white films
Films directed by Yves Allégret
Films based on operettas
Films with screenplays by Jean Aurenche
Italian comedy films
Lux Film films
1954 comedy films
Italian black-and-white films
1950s French films
1950s Italian films